Brandon Allen Dixon (born January 29, 1992) is an American professional baseball infielder and outfielder for the San Diego Padres of Major League Baseball (MLB). He has previously played in MLB for the Detroit Tigers and the Cincinnati Reds and in Nippon Professional Baseball (NPB) for the Tohoku Rakuten Golden Eagles.

Career

Amateur career
Dixon attended Murrieta Valley High School in Murrieta, California where he played high-school baseball alongside Patrick Wisdom, before enrolling at the University of Arizona and playing college baseball for the Arizona Wildcats in the Pac-12 Conference. After playing sparingly as a freshman, Dixon appeared in 62 games during the 2012 season during which the team won the College World Series. In his junior season, Dixon led the Pac-12 Conference both with a .369 batting average and 30 stolen bases and was named a third-team Louisville Slugger All-American.

Los Angeles Dodgers
After his junior season at Arizona, Dixon was drafted by the Los Angeles Dodgers in the third round of the 2013 MLB draft. He signed and spent 2013 with the Class-A Great Lakes Loons where he slashed .185/.227/.261 with one home run and 17 RBIs in 59 games. In 2014, he played for the Class-A Advanced Rancho Cucamonga Quakes compiling a .262 batting average with nine home runs and 46 RBIs in 94 games, and in 2015, he played for both the Quakes and Double-A Tulsa Drillers, batting .263 with 19 home runs, 68 RBIs, and 26 stolen bases in 128 games between the two teams.

Cincinnati Reds
On December 16, 2015, Dixon was traded to the Cincinnati Reds (with José Peraza and Scott Schebler) in a three team trade that sent Frankie Montas, Micah Johnson and Trayce Thompson to the Dodgers and Todd Frazier to the Chicago White Sox. He spent 2016 with the Double-A Pensacola Blue Wahoos where he slashed .260/.315/.434 with 16 home runs and 65 RBIs in 118 games, and 2017 with the Triple-A Louisville Bats where he collected a .264 batting average with 16 home runs, 64 RBIs, and a .783 OPS in 124 games.

Dixon was called up to the majors for the first time on May 22, 2018. On May 24 he collected his first three major league hits, going on to play in 74 games for the Reds during the 2018 season at six different defensive positions, in addition to two appearances as a pitcher. He batted .178/.218/.356 in 118 at bats and was recorded as having the fastest base-running sprint speed of all major league first basemen, at 28.9 feet/second.

Detroit Tigers
Dixon was claimed off waivers by the Detroit Tigers on November 2, 2018. He began the 2019 season with the Triple-A Toledo Mud Hens before being promoted to the major leagues on April 18. In a May 5 game against the Kansas City Royals, Dixon hit a tenth-inning, walk-off three-run homer to give the Tigers a 5–2 victory. Dixon finished 2019 with a .248 average, 52 RBI and a team-leading 15 home runs in 391 major league at-bats. He had the fastest sprint speed of all major league first basemen, at 28.5 feet/second. On December 21, 2019, Dixon was designated for assignment by the Tigers to make room on the 40-man roster for two free agent signings. He cleared waivers and was outrighted to the Toledo Mud Hens on January 8. On September 22, 2020, Dixon was selected to the Tigers 40-man and active rosters. Dixon appeared in only 5 games for the Tigers in 2020, going 1-for-13.

He was released by the Tigers on November 19, 2020, with the intention that he would be heading to a team in Nippon Professional Baseball.

Tohoku Rakuten Golden Eagles
Days after his release from Detroit, Dixon signed with the Tohoku Rakuten Golden Eagles of Nippon Professional Baseball. On April 23, 2021, Dixon made his NPB debut. Dixon played in 38 games for the Golden Eagles, hitting .167 with 4 home runs and 35 RBIs. He became a free agent following the season.

San Diego Padres
On March 26, 2022, Dixon signed a minor league contract with the San Diego Padres. In the minor leagues in 2022 he led the minors in slugging percentage (.823) in 198 at bats while batting .374 with a .442 on base percentage and 23 home runs. His contract was selected on September 27.

References

External links

 

1992 births
Living people
People from La Jolla, San Diego
Baseball players from San Diego
Cincinnati Reds players
Detroit Tigers players
San Diego Padres players
Arizona Wildcats baseball players
Great Lakes Loons players
Rancho Cucamonga Quakes players
Arizona League Dodgers players
Adelaide Bite players
Tulsa Drillers players
Glendale Desert Dogs players
Pensacola Blue Wahoos players
Peoria Javelinas players
Louisville Bats players
Toledo Mud Hens players
Tohoku Rakuten Golden Eagles players
El Paso Chihuahuas players
San Antonio Missions players
American expatriate baseball players in Australia
American expatriate baseball players in Japan